Hearts Afire is an American television sitcom created by Linda Bloodworth-Thomason, starring John Ritter and Markie Post that aired on CBS from September 14, 1992, to February 1, 1995. The series' title is taken from a line in the Earth, Wind & Fire song "That's the Way of the World" (which originally served as the series' theme song).

Series premise
Described by CBS as a "politically topical series" and created by Linda Bloodworth-Thomason and Harry Thomason, the show starred John Ritter and Markie Post playing John Hartman and Georgie Anne Lahti, respectively. Supporting actors included Billy Bob Thornton and Ed Asner. The show was set in Washington, D.C., and centered on a conservative senator's aide (Ritter) and a liberal political reporter (Post) whose professional disagreements masked a growing attraction for one another.  Other costars on the show included George Gaynes, Beth Broderick, and Wendie Jo Sperber.  The series was itself a satire on current affairs in Washington, D.C.

John and Georgie Anne married near the end of the first season. In the second season, the show abruptly changed its setting to the Southern town where John grew up; he returned to take over the town's failing newspaper, accompanied by Georgie Anne and his two children from a previous marriage. Some of the supporting characters made the move as well, while others were superseded.

Cast
John Hartman (portrayed by John Ritter)
Georgie Anne Lahti (portrayed by Markie Post)
Billy Bob Davis (portrayed by Billy Bob Thornton)

Cameos
Roger Clinton, half-brother of Bill Clinton, appeared in a cameo as a restaurant singer at the end of the series' third episode, aired in September 1992.
Hugh E. Rodham, father of the incoming First Lady of the United States, Hillary Rodham Clinton, made a cameo appearance in December 1992.  The producers of the series were friends of the Clintons.
Political pundit Rush Limbaugh guest-starred as himself on an April 1994 episode.  That episode had the series' highest rating, finishing as the 8th-highest ranked show of the week during its original airing.
Harry Anderson, Post's co-star on Night Court, made a cameo appearance in a March 1994 episode, portraying columnist Dave Barry as part of a crossover with Anderson's contemporary series, Dave's World.

Episodes

Series overview

Season 1 (1992–93)

Season 2 (1993–94)

Season 3 (1994–95)

Home media
Image Entertainment released the entire series on DVD in Region 1 in 2005 and 2006.

On November 7, 2012, it was announced that Mill Creek Entertainment had acquired the rights to the series and released Hearts Afire - The Complete Series on DVD on January 8, 2013. The 7-disc set features all 54 episodes of the series, as well as bonus features.

References

External links
 
 
 Hearts Afire webpage at TVHeaven.com

1990s American political comedy television series
1990s American satirical television series
1990s American sitcoms
1990s American workplace comedy television series
1992 American television series debuts
1995 American television series endings
CBS original programming
English-language television shows
Political satirical television series
Television series about marriage
Television series created by Linda Bloodworth-Thomason
Television shows set in Washington, D.C.